The William H. Lewis Model House is a historic residence in Portland, Oregon, United States. 

The house was listed on the National Register of Historic Places in 1990.

See also
National Register of Historic Places listings in Northwest Portland, Oregon

References

External links

Historic images of the William H. Lewis Model House from the University of Oregon Libraries digital collections

Houses completed in 1911
Colonial Revival architecture in Oregon
Houses on the National Register of Historic Places in Portland, Oregon
1911 establishments in Oregon
Northwest Portland, Oregon
Portland Historic Landmarks